Acradenia euodiiformis, commonly known as yellow satinheart or bonewood, is a species of tree that is endemic to eastern Australia. It has mostly trifoliate leaves, the leaflets narrow elliptic to lance-shaped, with prominent oil glands, and panicles of white flowers. It grows in and near rainforest.

Description 
The trunk is usually irregular in shape, rarely cylindrical, sometimes with several stems. The bark is creamy, usually smooth, somewhat corky with vertical lines of pustules. The outer surface of live bark is in patterns of red and cream. The leaflets are glabrous and have prominent, large oil glands.

Taxonomy
Yellow satinheart was first formally described in 1875 by Ferdinand von Mueller in Fragmenta phytographiae Australiae. Mueller gave it the name Bosistoa euodiiformis from specimens collected near the Clarence River by Mary Anne Wilcox. In 1977, Thomas Gordon Hartley changed the name to Acradenia euodiiformis in the Journal of the Arnold Arboretum.

Distribution and habitat
It is often seen in rainforests as an understorey tree, particularly on poorer sedimentary soils and along creeks, but sometimes on the more fertile basaltic soils and at relatively high altitudes.

References

euodiiformis
Sapindales of Australia
Trees of Australia
Flora of New South Wales
Flora of Queensland
Plants described in 1875
Taxa named by Ferdinand von Mueller